Elizabeth David: A Life in Recipes is a 2006 British drama television film directed by James Kent and starring Catherine McCormack, Greg Wise and Karl Johnson. Written by Amanda Coe, it is a depiction of the life of the cookery writer Elizabeth David. It first aired on the BBC in January 2006.

Cast
 Catherine McCormack – Elizabeth David 
 Greg Wise – Peter Higgins 
 Karl Johnson – Norman Douglas 
 Kieran O'Brien – Charles Gibson Cowan 
 Jacqueline Defferary – Bulgie 
 Andrew Havill – Tony David 
 Tilly Blackwood – Doreen Thornton 
 Richard Bailey – waiter 
 Jane Lapotaire – Ernestine Carter 
 Martin Savage – George 
 Alan Cox – Cuthbert 
 Emma Campbell-Jones – Frances 
 Georgie Glen – Pamela
 Lucy Scott – Patricia 
 Neville Phillips – Diner 
 Penelope Beaumont – Mrs Diner 
 Laura Lonsdale – Waitress 
 Bart Ruspoli – Italian Doctor 
 Sophie Duval – TV Reporter

References

External links
 
 

2006 television films
2006 films
2000s English-language films
2000s British films
British drama television films